The following is a list of awards and nominations received by Prison Break, an American drama television series which has aired on the Fox Broadcasting Company since August 29, 2005.

Australian Film Institute Awards 
The Australian Film Institute Awards are presented by the Australian Academy of Cinema and Television Arts.

ALMA Awards
The ALMA Awards are presented by the National Council of La Raza.

Eddie Awards 
The Eddie Awards are presented by the American Cinema Editors.

Golden Globe Awards 
The Golden Globe Awards are presented by the Hollywood Foreign Press Association.

Golden Reel Awards 
The Golden Reel Awards are presented by the Motion Picture Sound Editors.

Leo Awards 
The Leo Awards are presented by the Motion Picture Arts and Sciences Foundation of British Columbia.

People's Choice Awards 
The People's Choice Awards are presented by the American basic cable channel E!.

Primetime Emmy Awards 
The Primetime Emmy Awards are presented by the Academy of Television Arts and Sciences.

Satellite Awards 
The Satellite Awards are presented by the International Press Academy.

Saturn Awards 
The Saturn Awards are presented by the Academy of Science Fiction, Fantasy & Horror Films.

Screen Actors Guild Awards 
The Screen Actors Guild Awards are presented by the Screen Actors Guild.

Television Critics Association Awards 
The Television Critics Association Awards are presented by the Television Critics Association.

References

Awards and nominations
Prison Break